Roughness may refer to:

Surface roughness, the roughness of a surface
Roughness length, roughness as applied in meteorology
International Roughness Index, the roughness of a road
Hydraulic roughness, the roughness of land and waterway features
Roughness (psychophysics) in psychoacoustics refers to the level of dissonance
The 'roughness' of a line or surface, measured numerically by the Hausdorff dimension
Roughness/resel, the resel/roughness of an image/volume
Unnecessary roughness, a type of foul in gridiron football

See also
Surface finish